Angry is the adjective derived from the emotion of anger.

Angry may also refer to:
"Angry" (1925 song)
"Angry" (Matchbox Twenty song)
"Angry," a song by Billy Squier from his 1993 album Tell the Truth
"Angry," a song by Quiet Riot from Alive and Well

People with the surname
Raymond Angry, American keyboardist, record producer and composer

See also
Anger (disambiguation)